I. Shanmughadas is a writer and film critic from Kerala, India. He received the National Film Award for Best Film Critic in 1999.

Education and career
He was born in Ottappalam, Shanmughadas.

After acquiring a postgraduate degree in English literature, he began his professional life as a teacher in Mumbai. Later, he was a lecturer in English literature in various Government colleges across the state. He retired as professor from Sri C. Achutha Menon Government College, Thrissur. Early associations with film societies inspired him to take an active part in the film society movement and activities. In the latter half of the 1970s Shanmughadas started writing articles on cinema.

Recognition 
He received the National Award for the best film critic in 1999. Sanchariyude Veedu, a book on the films of Satyajit Ray, won the State award for the best book on cinema in 1996. "Daivanarthakante Krodham", his article on M.T Vasudevan Nair's Nirmalyam, won him the State Award for the best article written on films of the year 2013.

He is the recipient of Kerala Sahitya Akademi’s Vilasini Puraskaram for the best literary criticism for his book Shareeram Nadhi Nakhathram on The God of Small Things, G.N Pilla Endowment Award for the best academic article (2008), Kozhikodan Award for the best book on cinema (2012) and Film Critic’s Association’s Awards for the best book on cinema of the years 1997 and 2006 as well.

In 2022 Shanmughadas received Satyajit Ray Memorial Award  instituted by FIPRESCI-India (International Federation of Film Critics).

Published works
 Malakalil Manju Peyyunnu
 Cinemayude Vazhiyil
 Sanchariyude Veedu
 Aaranu Buddhanallaathathu
 Godard: Colaykkum Marxinum Naduvil
 P. Ramadas: Vidyarthiyude Vazhi
 Cinemayum Chila Samvidhayakarum
 Shareeram Nadi Nakshathram

References 

Indian film critics
Kerala State Film Award winners
Malayalam-language writers
Writers from Thrissur
Film people from Kerala
20th-century Indian non-fiction writers
Living people
Malayali people
Year of birth missing (living people)
Best Critic National Film Award winners